The Halifax Pop Explosion was a music festival and conference that occurred  every fall, typically two weeks after Thanksgiving, in Halifax, Nova Scotia, Canada. The term "Halifax Pop Explosion" also came to be adopted in the 1990s as the name of the Halifax alternative rock music scene as a whole, which at that time was dominated by power pop acts such as Sloan, Jale, The Super Friendz, and Thrush Hermit.

History
Founded in 1993, the Halifax Pop Explosion has actually been three different events that are now remembered as one long standing event. The original Halifax Pop Explosion, which was operated as private business from 1993–1995, was created as a platform to celebrate Halifax's newfound fame as the "Seattle of the North" and home of Canadian grunge, as well as to promote local bands such as Sloan, The Inbreds, Jale, The Super Friendz, and Thrush Hermit.

The company that organized the festival went out of business and a new organization launched the "Halifax On Music Festival", which ran successfully but not profitably for four years. The festival did not take place in 2000.
In 2001, Waye Mason, a past owner of the Halifax On Music Festival, created the not-for-profit Halifax Pop Explosion Association to operate the festival for the good of the music community, regardless of long term profitability.  The festival name returned to the Halifax Pop Explosion and the event has doubled in size since 2001.  The Festival has expanded its programming to support other genres within the independent music community, as well as the power pop that it is best known for.  By 2006, it was featuring acts from hip hop and electronica to folk rock and alt-country to punk and hardcore. With 180 plus bands in 20 venues all around town over five days, the festival exhibits considerable breadth in presenting new music.

Venues

 The Seahorse Tavern
 The Marquee Ballroom
 The Carleton
 Halifax Central Library
 The Rebecca Cohn Auditorium
 Gus' Pub
 Bus Stop Theatre
 North Memorial Library
 The Khyber
 The Pavilion
 CKDU Lobby
 Art Bar + Projects

Conference 
The Halifax Pop Explosion conference is held annually at the Halifax Central Library.

XPAND
The XPAND Panel focuses on inclusivity in music and is typically free to the public and includes panels, forums, keynote speakers, songwriters, artists, industry leaders, music executives, and community leaders.

Label Summit
The Label Summit's purpose is to discuss issues within the music industry that are affecting labels and artists. The summit has delegates from around the world and is great for networking and career building.

Sync Summit
Industry experts and artists looking for sync placements converse in one on one talks, roundtable discussions and networking mixers.

Mentor Cafe
Presented by Women In Music Canada and Music Ontario, the Mentor Cafe is for female-identifying and non-binary persons who are looking to meet and converse with female delegates.

2017 Lido Pimienta incident
A disruption occurred during Lido Pimienta's concert at the festival on October 19, 2017. According to a statement that was released by the festival "the incident involved a white volunteer photographer and several white audience members who reacted negatively when Pimienta invited 'brown girls to the front' during her Oct. 19 show" (as reported by The Canadian Press). When the festival-sanctioned volunteer photographer, who was engaged in documenting the performance, refused to move after ten separate requests, Pimienta said, "You're cutting into my set time and you're disrespecting these women, and I don't have time for this". The volunteer was removed from the show and the festival organizers apologized to Pimienta.

Related events
In addition to the music, the Halifax Pop Explosion also continues to support a variety of independent arts and pop-culture events.  The Indie Zine and Label Fair, which had been growing since 1996, was replaced in 2006 by three events: the #POPular Conference, a DIY and independent music-focused conference; Halifax Zine Fair, the Atlantic Canada edition of the zine fair and independent publishing event curated by Broken Pencil Magazine; and a series of art gallery exhibitions stage around town.

See also

List of country music festivals
List of festivals in Canada
Music of Canada

References

External links
Halifax Pop Explosion official website

Music festivals in Halifax, Nova Scotia
Country music festivals in Canada
Rock festivals in Canada
Folk festivals in Canada
Music conferences
Music festivals established in 1993
Pop music festivals in Canada